Achillea ligustica, the southern yarrow or Ligurian yarrow, is a flowering plant in the sunflower family. It is native to southern Europe (Italy, Spain, France, Greece, western Balkans) and sparingly naturalized in scattered locations in North America.

References

ligustica
Flora of Europe
Plants described in 1773